The Truth is the fourth album by American metalcore band Bleeding Through, and their second album released through Trustkill Records. The album was released on January 10, 2006, produced by Rob Caggiano, lead guitarist of Anthrax. This was the last album to feature lead guitarist and founding member Scott Danough.

The album produced three singles ("Kill to Believe", "Love in Slow Motion" and "Line in the Sand"), all with accompanying music videos (with "Love in Slow Motion" being a sequel to the "Kill to Believe" video).

Reception 

The Truth entered the Billboard charts at number 48 (with 17,000 copies sold in its first week) making it the highest-charting release by the band to date. It has gone on to sell more than 250,000 copies since its release.

Although it received mostly mixed reviews, Billboard magazine called The Truth "one of the four most important hard rock albums of 2006".

The Complete Truth 

A special edition of the album entitled The Complete Truth was released on July 15, 2008. The band penned a guest blog on the Headbanger's Blog and commented on the release:

Track listing

B-sides 
 "13 Scars" – 2:54 (only iTunes version of the CD)
 "One Last Second" – 3:43 (released on Trustkill Takeover, Volume II)

"Complete edition" bonus DVD – Live in San Diego 
 "For Love and Failing"
 "Tragedy of Empty Streets"
 "Love in Slow Motion"
 "Revenge I Seek"
 "The Painkiller"
 "Love Lost in a Hail of Gunfire"
 "Kill to Believe"

Personnel 

Bleeding Through
Brandan Schieppati – lead vocals
Scott Danough – guitar
Brian Leppke – guitar
Marta Peterson – keyboards
Ryan Wombacher – bass
Derek Youngsma – drums

Guest musicians
Nick 13 (Tiger Army) – vocals on "Dearly Demented"
Ben Falgoust (Goatwhore, Soilent Green) – vocals on "For Love and Failing"
Rob Caggiano (Anthrax) – guitars on "Hollywood Prison" and "Line in the Sand"

Production
Rob Caggiano – guitar, producer, engineer, mixing
Joe Marchiano – recording, mixing (bonus tracks)
Thomas Eberger – mastering
Jeff Gros – photography
Paul Orofino – MC, mixing
Eddie Wohl – editing

Charts

References 

Bleeding Through albums
2006 albums
Trustkill Records albums
Roadrunner Records albums